John Stuart Hinton Gaskain, CBE, OStJ, QPM (11 May 1910 – 16 November 1971) was Commandant of the National Police College from January 1966 to July 1968.

Gaskain was educated at Haileybury. He joined the Metropolitan Police in 1936. He qualified as a barrister in 1944. He was Assistant Chief Constable of Norfolk Police from 1942 to 1952; Chief Constable of the Cumberland and Westmorland force from 1952 to 1959; and Chief Constable of Gloucestershire from 1960 to 1962. He joined Her Majesty's Inspectorate of Constabulary in 1962.

References

British Chief Constables
1910 births
1971 deaths
English recipients of the Queen's Police Medal
Commanders of the Order of the British Empire
People educated at Haileybury and Imperial Service College
Officers of the Order of St John